The 1989 Canadian Soccer League season was the third season of play for the Canadian Soccer League, a Division 1 men's soccer league in the Canadian soccer pyramid.

Format and changes from previous season
The Victoria Vistas joined the Canadian Soccer League as an expansion team for the 1990 season, joining the West Division. The divisions were now even with five teams each. 

The Calgary Kickers folded following the 1988 season, but the club was replaced by a community-owned team called the Calgary Strikers.

Similar to the previous season, the teams played an unbalanced schedule with two-thirds of a team's matches coming against teams in their own division(4 matches each) and one-third against the opposite division (2 matches each) for a total of 26 matches. Following the season, the top three teams in each division would advance to the playoffs, with the division leaders earning a first round bye, to designate a national champion club. This season would see the first two rounds of the playoffs being played in two-legged times determined by aggregate score, while the final would remain a single match championship final.

Summary
Vancouver repeated as West Division champions, while Toronto won their first East Division title. Hamilton reached the final despite for the third consecutive year, where they faced Vancouver for the second year in a row, with the 86ers repeating as champions.

Vancouver was dominant again, losing but two regular-season matches en route to a second straight victory over Hamilton in the championship game.  The 86ers went 46 consecutive games from the previous season into this one without losing, which is a record for a professional sports team in Canada.

Regular season

East Division

West Division

Overall

Playoffs

Quarterfinal 

Edmonton Brick Men won 3–1 on aggregate.

Hamilton Steelers won 2–1 on aggregate.

Semifinal 

Vancouver 86ers won 9–3 on aggregate.

Hamilton Steelers won 3–2 on aggregate.

Final

Statistics

Top scorers

Top goaltenders

Honours
The following awards and nominations were awarded for the 1989 season.

League All-Stars

Reserves

Front office

Average home attendances

References

External links
 Canadian Soccer League 1991 Media Guide and Statistics
 1989 CSL Stats

Canadian Soccer League
Canadian Soccer League (1987–1992) seasons